This is a round-up of the 1987 Sligo Intermediate Football Championship. Easkey came good to claim their second Intermediate title, after defeating Owenmore Gaels in the final.

Quarter finals

Semi-finals

Sligo Intermediate Football Championship Final

Sligo Intermediate Football Championship
Sligo Intermediate Football Championship